Mimoxenolea is a genus of beetles in the family Cerambycidae, containing the following species:

 Mimoxenolea bicoloricornis Breuning, 1960
 Mimoxenolea ornata (Breuning, 1961)
 Mimoxenolea sikkimensis (Breuning, 1961)

References

Acanthocinini